Matthias Dürmeyer (born 17 April 1990) is a German footballer who plays as a defender.

References

External links
 Profile at DFB.de
 Profile at kicker.de

1990 births
Living people
People from Abensberg
Sportspeople from Lower Bavaria
Footballers from Bavaria
German footballers
Association football defenders
SSV Jahn Regensburg players
3. Liga players
SSV Jahn Regensburg II players